Thomas Bates (born 31 August 1985) is an English footballer who last played for Barwell, where he played as a midfielder.

Career
Bates began his career at Championship side Coventry City, playing in their under-17s and being signed professionally as a 17-year-old. He attended the Woodlands school.

Bates made his debut on 12 April, 2003, in a league fixture at home to Ipswich Town, which Ipswich won 4–2. Bates came on as a 77th minute substitute for Craig Pead. He appeared for Coventry during a time in which the club was trying to save money by playing younger players on short-term incentive deals.

Bates appeared for Bedworth in 2004 after being picked up by United boss Mark Hallam. Bates also played for Rochdale, Nuneaton, Atherstone, and Leamington.

References

External links
 Soccerbase
 Soccerbase

1985 births
Living people
English footballers
Association football midfielders
English Football League players
Coventry City F.C. players
Rochdale A.F.C. players
Barwell F.C. players